José Francisco "Pepe" Fanjul (born 1944) is a Cuban-born businessman. He is the second eldest of the Fanjul brothers, who control a sugar and real estate business valued at US$8.2 billion.

Early life
Fanjul is the second son of Alfonso Fanjul Sr. and his wife Lillian Rosa Gomez-Mena. He received a bachelor's degree from Villanova University, and an MBA from New York University (NYU).

Career
Fanjul is the vice chairman and president of Flo-Sun, a Fanjul family-owned sugar growing and refining company, and of Florida Crystals.

Political interests
Fanjul is a longstanding supporter of Republican politicians, one of the largest contributors to George W. Bush, a leading patron of Marco Rubio, and has co-hosted a large fundraiser for Donald Trump. His brother Alfonso Fanjul Jr. has been a leading Democrat supporter since at least 1992, and was co-chair of Bill Clinton's Florida campaign.

He and his brother, Alfy Fanjul Jr., both hold Spanish and American passports. They are close friends of the ex-King Juan Carlos and have stated on various occasions that they would be willing to receive the exiled king as a guest in any of their mansions around the world.

Personal life
He is married to Emilia May Fanjul, and they live in Palm Beach, Florida. They also own an apartment at 960 Fifth Avenue, New York City.

In 2002, the New York Times reported that Fanjul had "considered" leaving his wife for socialite Nina Griscom, with whom he had a "celebrated affair" (and who was married to plastic surgeon Daniel Baker), but had "changed his mind".

In 2002, their daughter Emilia Helena Fanjul married Brian C. Pfeifler, executive director managing private client accounts at Morgan Stanley, son of Brian D. Pfeifler of Gulf Stream, Florida.

In 2010, Fanjul refused to fire his executive assistant, the long-time white nationalist Chloe Hardin Black, who was married first to David Duke, the former national leader of the Ku Klux Klan and "America’s most well-known racist and anti-Semite", and then to Don Black, another former Ku Klux Klan leader and member of the American Nazi Party, who runs the hateful neo-Nazi, white supremacist and Holocaust denial Stormfront Internet forum, the premier site for white supremacists in the world. The website is believed to be at least partly supported by the salary that Florida Crystals, the Fanjuls' sugar conglomerate, paid Chloe Black.

References

1944 births
People from Havana
People from Palm Beach, Florida
Cuban emigrants to the United States
Cuban businesspeople
Businesspeople from Florida
American billionaires
Cuban billionaires
Living people
Villanova University alumni
New York University alumni
Fanjul family